The winners and nominees of the Asia Pacific Screen Award for Best Feature Film are

Winners and nominees

2000s

2010's

References

External links

 
Awards for best Asian film
Lists of films by award